Nantawat Tansopa (born February 22, 1984), simply known as ying, is a Thai professional footballer. He is currently a Player-coach at Chiangrai City.

Club career

He was also the leading scorer of the 2008 AFC Champions League with 9 goals.

Honours

Club
Police United
 Thai Division 1 League: 2006

Individual
 AFC Champions League Top Scorer : 2008

References

External links
 Profile at Goal

1984 births
Living people
Nantawat Tansopa
Nantawat Tansopa
Association football forwards
Nantawat Tansopa
Nantawat Tansopa
Nantawat Tansopa
Nantawat Tansopa